Zara Steiner,  (née Shakow; 6 November 1928 – 13 February 2020) was an American-born British historian and academic.

Born in New York City, she was the daughter of Frances (née Price) and Joseph Shakow. Her father was an outfitter who provided equipment to polar explorers, and her mother was a homemaker. Shakow was a 1948 graduate of Swarthmore College in Pennsylvania and gained bachelor's and master's degrees from the University of Oxford in 1950 (in two years, rather than three) and 1954 respectively. Tutored by both AJP Taylor and Isaiah Berlin, she asked the former to be her doctoral supervisor, but Taylor disapproved of the PhD, which he did not consider worthwhile. She received her doctorate in History from Harvard in 1957.

Steiner specialised in foreign relations, international relations and 20th-century history of Europe and of the United States. Richard J. Evans described her two volumes in the Oxford History of Modern Europe (The Lights That Failed and The Triumph of the Dark) as the "standard works" on international diplomacy between both world wars.

From 1968 to 1995, Steiner was a Fellow of New Hall (now Murray Edwards College) of Cambridge University. In 2007, she was elected a Fellow of the British Academy (FBA), the UK's national academy for the humanities and the social sciences.

She married the literary critic and scholar George Steiner in 1955. He predeceased her by ten days. The couple were introduced by their respective Harvard professors who knew both of them.

Selected works

References

1928 births
2020 deaths
21st-century American historians
American women historians
British historians
British Jews
British women historians
Historians of Europe
Historians of the United States
Jewish American historians
Fellows of Murray Edwards College, Cambridge
Fellows of the British Academy
Place of birth missing
21st-century British women writers
Swarthmore College alumni
Alumni of the University of Oxford
Harvard University alumni
American emigrants to the United Kingdom
21st-century American women
21st-century American Jews